Alina is a 1950 Italian melodrama film directed by Giorgio Pastina. The film stars Gina Lollobrigida as  Alina and Amedeo Nazzari as  Giovanni.

Cast
Gina Lollobrigida as  Alina
Amedeo Nazzari as  Giovanni
Doris Dowling as  Marie
Juan de Landa as Lucien
Otello Toso as Marco
Lauro Gazzolo as Alina's Husband
Camillo Pilotto as Andrea
Gino Cavalieri as Giulio
Vittorio André
Oscar Andriani as A smuggler
Frank Colson as L'Americano
 as Il brigadiere

External links 
 

1950 films
1950s Italian-language films
Italian black-and-white films
Films directed by Giorgio Pastina
1950 drama films
Italian drama films
Melodrama films
1950s Italian films